John S. Jacobs (1815 or 1817 – December 19, 1873) was an African-American author and abolitionist. After escaping from slavery he published his autobiography entitled A True Tale of Slavery in the four consecutive editions of the London weekly The Leisure Hour in February 1861. He also features prominently in the classic Incidents in the Life of a Slave Girl, authored by his sister Harriet Jacobs.

Life

Early life in slavery 

John Jacobs was born in Edenton, North Carolina, in 1815. His mother was Delilah Horniblow, a slave of the Horniblow family who owned a local tavern. The father of John and his sister Harriet (born 1813) was Elijah Knox. Elijah Knox, although enslaved, was in some ways privileged because he was an expert carpenter. He died in 1826.

John's mother died when he was four years old. He was allowed to continue living with his father, until at the age of nine he was hired out to Dr. James Norcom, the deceased tavern keeper's son-in-law. His sister Harriet, whom her former owner had willed to Norcom's three-year-old daughter, was also living with Norcom.

After the death of Horniblow's widow, her slaves were sold at New Year's Day auction 1828, among them John, his grandmother Molly and Molly's son Mark. Being sold at public auction was a traumatic experience for 12-year-old John. He was bought by Dr. Norcom and continued living in the same house as his sister.

While enslaved by Norcom, John Jacobs learned basic health care and succeeded in teaching himself to read (only very few slaves were literate), but even when he escaped from slavery as a young adult he was not able to write.

Soon Norcom started to harass John's sister Harriet sexually. Hoping to escape his constant harassment, she started a relationship with Samuel Sawyer, a white lawyer, who would later be elected to the House of Representatives.

In June 1835, Harriet's situation as Norcom's slave had become unbearable and she decided to escape. Furious, Norcom sold John Jacobs together with Harriet's two children to a slave trader, hoping he would transport them outside the state, thus separating them for ever from their mother and sister. But the trader had been secretly in league with Sawyer, the children's father, to whom he sold all three of them.

Escape and abolitionism 
In 1838, John accompanied his new owner Sawyer as his personal servant on his honeymoon trip through the North and got his freedom by simply leaving Sawyer in New York, where slavery had been abolished. Both he himself and his sister make a point of mentioning in their respective memoirs, that John fulfilled his servant's duties to the last, leaving everything in good order and not stealing any money from his master. After unsuccessfully trying to work for his living by day and to attend school at night, in August 1839 he went on a whaling voyage, taking with him all the books he wanted to study.

After returning after three and a half years, John S. Jacobs, as he called himself after his escape to freedom, became more and more involved with the abolitionists led by William Lloyd Garrison. In November 1847, he went on a four-and-a-half-month lecturing tour together with captain Jonathan Walker. Walker, a white man, showed his hand as proof of the slaveholders' barbaric brutality. The hand had been branded with the letters SS (meaning "slave stealer") after he had tried to assist a group of fugitives.

After that, Jacobs undertook other lecture tours for the abolitionist cause on his own. Early in 1849, he went on a 16-day tour together with Frederick Douglass, who had made his escape from slavery in 1838 only weeks before Jacobs had made his.

For a short period in 1849, Jacobs, with the help of his sister Harriet, took over the management of the "Anti-Slavery Office and Reading Room" in Rochester, New York, which was situated in the same building as Douglass's newspaper The North Star.

In 1850, Congress passed the Fugitive Slave Law which made it easier for slaveholders to force fugitives back into slavery. John S. Jacobs was one of the speakers on rallies protesting against that law.
At the end of that year, he went to California to try his luck as a gold miner. Later he went on to Australia together with Harriet's son Joseph, again searching for gold. It is not clear, whether his decision to go to California and on to Australia was caused by the Fugitive Slave Law. His sister explicitly states that the law did not apply to John S., because he didn't come to the free states as fugitive, but was brought there by his master. On the other hand, Garrison wrote many years later on occasion of John Jacobs's funeral, that he stayed on in the North until the Fugitive Slave Law was passed and then left the county "knowing that there was no longer any safety for him on our soil."

He did not have much success either in California or in Australia, and so went on to England, going to sea from there. When his sister went to Great Britain in 1858 and again in 1867/68, the siblings failed to meet, because on both occasions John was at sea – in 1858, he was in the Middle East, ten years later in India. Still, John S. and Harriet Jacobs always kept in touch by mail.

Autobiography 

The idea to write down their experiences as slaves cannot have been new to the Jacobs siblings. As early as 1845 Frederick Douglass had written A Narrative of the Life of Frederick Douglass, an American Slave. John S. himself was the one to urge his sister to write down her story. Abolitionist and feminist Amy Post whom Harriet Jacobs had come to know through John, finally was the person to convince Harriet, who in 1853 started working on her Incidents in the Life of a Slave Girl, published in January 1861.

John Jacobs' own narrative is much shorter. It was published in the four February editions of the London weekly The Leisure Hour in 1861, entitled A True Tale of Slavery. The first three parts narrate his life up to his escaping and going on the whaling voyage, the fourth part relates cruelties against other slaves he had witnessed. Both siblings relate in their respective narratives their own experiences, experiences made together, and episodes in the life of the other sibling. Still, John mentions neither Norcom's sexual harassment nor Sawyer's relationship with his sister. Harriet's children first appear in the moment they are put into jail together with their uncle in preparation for their sale to the trader. Since he doesn't mention the parental relationship between his last owner and his sister's children, the reasons for Sawyer's interest in buying children and uncle remain unclear in John Jacobs' tale. This is also true for the reasons of the good treatment John Jacobs received while being Sawyer's slave, who didn't treat his numerous other slaves well. These things only become clear to the readers of Harriet's book.

Harriet Jacobs changes all the names in her book, given names as well as family names. However, John Jacobs (called "William" in his sister's book) uses the correct given names, but only uses the (correct) first letter of the family names. So Dr. Norcom is "Dr. Flint" in Harriet's book, but "Dr. N-" in John's. The only exceptions in John's tale are Sawyer, whose name he abbreviates at first, but later gives in full, and his own name, which he gives as the signature under the letter written by a friend, in which he tells Sawyer that he has left: "No longer yours, John S. Jacobs".

Family and death 

In the mid-1860s, aged about 50, John S. Jacobs married Englishwoman Elleanor Ashland, who had two children from a previous relationship. The only child they had together, Joseph Ramsey Jacobs, was born about 1866.

In 1873, he returned to the U.S. together with his wife and the three children to live in Cambridge, Massachusetts, close to his sister and her daughter Louisa Matilda. He died the same year, on December 19, 1873. Having been invited by Louisa Matilda, William Lloyd Garrison participated in the funeral. Harriet and Louisa Matilda Jacobs later were interred at his side on Mount Auburn Cemetery.

His widow stayed in the United States until her death in 1903, but it seems that there was no further contact between Harriet Jacobs' family and hers. Harriet's biographer Jean Fagan Yellin supposes that Elleanor Jacobs severed the ties so that her children would not fall victims to American racism. Seemingly Joseph Ramsey Jacobs was able to "pass for white".

Notes and references

Notes

References

Bibliography

External link 
 Short biography of Harriet, John, and Louisa Jacobs by Friends of Mount Auburn, including pictures of the tombstones of Harriet, John and Louisa Jacobs

1815 births
1873 deaths
People from Edenton, North Carolina
19th-century American slaves
African-American abolitionists
African-American sailors
Burials at Mount Auburn Cemetery
People who wrote slave narratives
Literate American slaves
19th-century American writers
Burials in Massachusetts
Activists from North Carolina
19th-century African-American people
19th-century African-American writers